Abdellah Zoubir (born 5 December 1991) is a French professional footballer who plays as an attacking midfielder or a winger for Azerbaijan Premier League club Qarabağ.

He started out his senior career at Grenoble, after which he went on to compete professionally in Scotland, Romania and Azerbaijan, respectively. In the latter country, Zoubir aided Qarabağ in winning three national titles and one national cup.

Career

Early career and Istres
Born in Lille of Moroccan descent, Zoubir started playing futsal in his native city at the age of 6. He represented France at youth level in that sport, sharing teams at one point with Wissam Ben Yedder. In 2012, Zoubir signed for Istres in Ligue 2. He was loaned in January 2013 to lower league club Grenoble.

In August 2013, Zoubir joined Scottish side Hibernian on loan after being recommended by former footballer Frédéric Arpinon. He made his first start for his new team in a Scottish League Cup match against Stranraer on 24 September, also scoring the second goal in a 5–3 win. However, after the departure of manager Pat Fenlon, he did not seem to enter the plans of new coach Terry Butcher, coming on mostly as a substitute.

An ankle injury kept Zoubir out for five months, and he ended the season (which ended in relegation after 15 years) with 16 matches and one goal all competitions comprised. He subsequently returned to Istres, now in the Championnat National.

Petrolul Ploiești
On 24 June 2015, Zoubir joined Romanian side Petrolul Ploiești on a three-year contract. He made his Liga I debut on 11 July, playing the full 90 minutes in a 0–0 draw at defending champions FC Steaua București; he adapted quickly, being voted Footballer of the Month for July by fans on the DoarPetrolul.ro forum. He netted his first goal for the club on 9 November in a 1–1 home draw against Concordia Chiajna, and his second came against CFR Cluj late in the same month (1–0, also at the Ilie Oană Stadium).

During early December 2015, it was reported that Bucharest rivals Steaua and Dinamo were interested in acquiring Zoubir in the winter transfer window.

Qarabağ
On 26 June 2018, Zoubir signed a two-year contract with Qarabağ.

Career statistics

Honours
Qarabağ
Azerbaijan Premier League: 2018–19, 2019–20, 2021–22
Azerbaijan Cup: 2021–22

References

External links

1991 births
Living people
French sportspeople of Moroccan descent
Footballers from Lille
French footballers
Moroccan footballers
Association football midfielders
Ligue 2 players
Championnat National players
Championnat National 2 players
FC Istres players
Grenoble Foot 38 players
RC Lens players
Scottish Professional Football League players
Hibernian F.C. players
Liga I players
FC Petrolul Ploiești players
Azerbaijan Premier League players
Qarabağ FK players
French expatriate footballers
Expatriate footballers in Scotland
Expatriate footballers in Romania
Expatriate footballers in Azerbaijan
French expatriate sportspeople in Scotland
French expatriate sportspeople in Romania
French expatriate sportspeople in Azerbaijan